Mititei or mici (both Romanian words meaning "little ones", "small ones") is a dish from the Romanian cuisine, consisting of grilled ground meat rolls in cylindrical shape made from a mixture of beef, lamb with spices, such as  garlic, black pepper, thyme, coriander, anise, savory, and sometimes a touch of paprika. Sodium bicarbonate and broth or water are also added to the mixture. It is similar to ćevapi and other ground meat based dishes throughout the Balkans and Middle East.

It is often served with french fries, mustard and murături (pickled vegetables). 

If you want to learn how to cook them, this is the current recipe for them in Romania.

History 
A popular story claims that 'mici' or 'mititei' were invented in the late 14th century and that they are originating from the Ottoman Empire.

Throughout the years, the recipe lost some of the original ingredients, such as caraway seeds and allspice, and began being made with pork, rather than beef and lamb. Sodium bicarbonate, a raising agent, is also commonly added to the modern Romanian recipe, which improves both the flavor and the texture.

Cultural and economic significance 
Mici are very popular all across Romania, with an estimated 440 million mici consumed each year in Romania. They are eaten in homes, restaurants and pubs, but are probably most associated with outdoor grilling. As many Romanians celebrate International Workers' Day (1 May) by going to barbecues and picnics, mici have become strongly associated with the holiday in recent years, 30 million mititei being eaten in Romania on the first day of May in 2019. Mici are sometimes called the "national dish of Romania" in the media, despite lacking any such official designation.

In 2018, between 5% and 10% of all the mici produced in Romania were exported, mainly to countries with large Romanian diasporas, such as Italy, Spain and the United Kingdom.

See also
 Ćevapi, a Balkan dish 
 Dry meatballs
 Kebapcheta
 Kebab
 Chiftele – another Romanian dish
 Pârjoale – another Romanian dish

References 

Grilled skewers
Meatballs
Middle Eastern grilled meats
Romanian dishes
National dishes